The Club Hípic El Montanyà is a Spanish horse club, located in the comarca of Osona, Catalonia. For the 1992 Summer Olympics in neighboring Barcelona, it hosted the equestrian dressage and the cross country part of the eventing competitions.

References
1992 Summer Olympics official report. Volume 2. pp. 324–6.

Buildings and structures completed in 1991
Venues of the 1992 Summer Olympics
Olympic equestrian venues
Sports venues completed in 1991
1991 establishments in Spain